Robotic dogs are robots designed to resemble dogs in appearance and behavior, usually incorporating canine characteristics such as barking or tail-wagging. In addition, many such "dogs" have appeared as toys and in fiction.

Military and research

 BigDog, quadruped robot created by Boston Dynamics with funding from the Defense Advanced Research Projects Agency that is capable of traversing varied terrain and maintaining its balance on ice and snow.
 LittleDog, another Boston Dynamics' robot that is much smaller than the original BigDog project.
 Rhex, hexapod robot.
 Canid, quadruped with a flexible spine created by the U.S. Army Research Laboratory and UPenn.
 Cheetah, DARPA M3 program with a Boston Dynamics hydraulic quadruped and the MIT created electric Cheetah
 HyQ, hydraulic quadruped robot able to run up to 2 m/s, developed by the Advanced Robotics Department of the IIT (Istituto Italiano di Tecnologia) 
 SCARAB, climbing and walking quadruped robot developed by the Florida A&M University
 Rise, hexapod
 Titan, several versions of this quadruped were created
 MR4, quadruped robot 
 Scout I & II
 Silo4
 Cheeter (robot)

Commercial 
 ANYmal - inspection robot by anybotics
 Spot - Boston Dynamics

Consumer

 AIBO (Sony)
 Big Scratch & Little Scratch (Trendmasters)
 Build Your Own Robo Pup
 Bow-wow
 CHiP (WowWee)
 F.I.D.O.
 Gaylord (Ideal Toy Company), robotic dog controllable by leash, produced in the 1960s 
 Genibo, robotic dog produced by the Korean company Dasatech.
 I-Cybie (Silverlit Electronics)
 iDog (Hasbro) and (Tiger Electronics)
 iDog amp'd (Hasbro) and (Tiger Electronics)
 iDog Clip (Hasbro) and (Tiger Electronics)
 iDog Dance (Hasbro) and (Tiger Electronics)
 iDog soft speaker (Hasbro) and (Tiger Electronics)
 Lucky the Incredible Wonder Pup (Zizzle)
 Mio Pup (Tiger Electronics) An "emoto-tronic" robot pet with over 100 "eye-cons" to show its feelings
 Poo-Chi (Tiger Electronics)
 Robopet (WowWee)
 Rocket the Wonder Dog (Fisher Price)
 Smartpet, robot dog that uses an iPhone to be powered
 Space Dog (KO CO)
 Spotbot, retro style robotic dog
 Tekno the Robotic Puppy Appeared on the cover of Time magazine
 Teksta Popular in the 1990s, this toy was intended to be able to perform card tricks and respond to commands.
 Unitree robots, available in five different types: Go1, A1, BenBen, Aliengo and B1
 Wappy Dog
 Wrex the Dawg, robot dog
 Zoomer & Friends
 Mi CyberDog from (Xiaomi)
 I Robot, available in three different types i.e. DuoDuo, Lele, QiQi
Tombot, a robotic companion animal designed to be a viable option to a real dog for  dementia patients

Joinmax Digital Robot Dog JM-DOG-001], offered as a semi-assembled kit (no soldering required) at $331, it offers a 15 servo-based impressive freedom of motion. Control is possible through a serial connection to the included controller board, or through simple commands sequences stored in memory.
 Flip over dogs – there are many examples of many flip-over dogs designed to look like robots, such as F.I.D.O and Sparky.

In fiction

 AMEE (Autonomous Mapping Evaluation and Evasion) a military scouting robot with dog like characteristics in the 2000 film Red Planet
 A.R.F, a robotic dog from Puppy Dog Pals
 A.X.L., a robotic dog from the film of the same name.
 Bhakti, Vanille's pet robot from Final Fantasy XIII
 Bolts, from Alexander Key's 1966 book, small dog whose head was so small the electronic brain needed to be trimmed.
 C.H.O.M.P.S. (Canine Home Protection System) in the eponymous film from 1979.
 Cyber Mastiffs, used by the Adeptus Aribites in Warhammer 40,000
 Dog, Alyx's robotic pet, has several canine characteristics and was featured in the video games Half-life 2, Half-Life 2: Episode One, and Half-Life 2: Episode Two.
 Dogbot, robot dog from the Ford Fiesta commercials
 Dynomutt, Blue Falcon's robotic dog from the animated Hanna-Barbera television show.
 E-cyboPooch, briefly Professor Dr. Cinnamon J. Scudsworth's robot dog assistant in the 2002 animated show, Clone High. E-cybopooch ultimately reveals himself to be a double agent and is destroyed when Mr. Butlertron, Scudsworth's displaced former assistant, deflects a laser meant for Scudsworth with a pie. 
 Fix-it, a dog-like robot from the Disney Junior show Handy Manny.
 GIR, crazy alien robot who disguised himself as a green dog in the show Invader Zim.
 Goddard, from the Jimmy Neutron movie and TV series.
 K9, the Doctor's portable computer and robot, from the British BBC Television series Doctor Who, as well as the spin-offs K-9 and Company, The Sarah Jane Adventures and K-9.
 Muffit II, Daggit from Battlestar Galactica.
 Preston,  Wendolene's robot dog from the 1995 animated Wallace and Gromit film A Close Shave.  Both K-9 and Preston were created by Bob Baker.
 Rags,  Miles Monroe's pet in the Woody Allen movie Sleeper, who speaks (and woofs) with a human voice.
 Rat Thing, from Neal Stephenson's Snow Crash
 RIC [Robotic Interactive Canine], Power Rangers sidekick / weapon in Power Rangers Space Patrol Delta.
 Robutt, from Isaac Asimov's short story "A Boy's Best Friend."
 Robo-Dog from PAW Patrol
 Rover, Lunar Jim's Robot dog in the children's animation series of the same name.
 Runner, a rather large robot in the shape of a dog, pet and loyal friend of Grubb, from the PC role-playing video game Septerra Core.
 Rush and Treble from the Mega Man classic series
 Rusty, from the 1960s Swift comic strip "The Phantom Patrol".
 Wolf, from the 2013 Konami video game Metal Gear Rising: Revengeance.
 Serendipity Dog, from the 1960s/70s BBC science-themed children's television series Tom Tom.
 Slamhounds, robotic assassins in the novel Count Zero by William Gibson
 Sparkplug, Sari's robot dog, like Hasbro's toys in Transformers: Animated.
 In the Super NES video game Secret of Evermore, the protagonist's pet dog takes the form of a robot in some areas.
 Spot, Olie Polie's pet robot dog in Rolie Polie Olie.
 The Mechanical Hound, a robotic hunter killer who serves the firemen as a scent hound in the book Fahrenheit 451. Its mouth conceals a syringe containing tranquilizers.
 Toby,  the robot dog who was the companion of Halo Jones in the classic comic story The Ballad of Halo Jones.
 Yatterking, Yatterbull, and Yatteryokozuna three robotic dogs in Yatterman
 FENRIS Mechs from Mass Effect 2 and Mass Effect 3, also a DLC dog companion in ME3n
 Rex from Fallout: New Vegas, a "cyberhound" that can be recruited as a companion from The King in Freeside
 K-9 from Fallout 2, a "cyberdog" who was created by Dr. Schreber, available as a companion upon the player repairing it.
 Panzerhund, a deadly canine-looking robot employed by the Nazis in the Wolfenstein games from the 2009 game onward.
 Servo, a transforming robot emergency-response dog from Transformers: Rescue Bots.
 The main villain of Kingsman: The Golden Circle (2017) has two deadly robot dogs she named Jet and Bennie after the song of her idol Elton John.
 The 2017 Black Mirror episode "Metalhead" features a woman pursued by a deadly robotic dog, similar in design to the BigDog robot manufactured by Boston Dynamics.
 Wes Anderson's stop-motion animated feature Isle of Dogs features dog robots employed by the antagonists to assist their rescue teams and are later proposed as pets to replace real dogs.

In art
Fairfield Industrial Dog Object, FIDO large animated Fairfield Australian dog sculpture

In music
 MC Chris wrote a song named robotdog, describing his adventures with his robotic Aibo that takes over his life.

Open Source 
 Open dog - open source robot by James Bruton

See also
Robot locomotion

References 

 
 
Dogs
Robotic dogs